Kęstutis Orentas (born 15 March 1939) is a Lithuanian long-distance runner. He competed in the men's 5000 metres at the 1964 Summer Olympics, representing the Soviet Union.

References

1939 births
Living people
Athletes (track and field) at the 1964 Summer Olympics
Lithuanian male long-distance runners
Soviet male long-distance runners
Olympic athletes of the Soviet Union
Place of birth missing (living people)